Central Transportation is the public transportation system in Stevens Point, Wisconsin. It is owned and operated by the city of Stevens Point.

Services
The transit system operates three services:

Stevens Point City Bus: Four regular bus routes that serve the city and the surrounding communities of Whiting, Park Ridge, and the Crossroads Commons in Plover; three routes that serve the University of Wisconsin–Stevens Point campus. Route names are Green-1, Blue-2, Red-3, Yellow-4, UWSP Purple-5, UWSP Gold-6 and LNT (Late Night Transit)-7
Point Plus: A specialized door-to-door transportation service available to individuals with disabilities living in the city of Stevens Point and communities of Whiting and Park Ridge.
Portage County Transportation Program: 
-Grocery Shopping
-Nutrition Program
-Taxi service
-Volunteer Driver Program

The transit system offers late night service from 10:15 p.m. to 3:15 a.m. Thursday through Saturday when the UWSP campus is in full session. The service is paid for by University of Wisconsin–Stevens Point student fees, but anyone can use the service free of charge.

Ridership

See also
 List of bus transit systems in the United States
 List of intercity bus stops in Wisconsin
 Metro Ride

References

External links
Stevens Point Transit official website

Stevens Point, Wisconsin
Bus transportation in Wisconsin